Stickin' Around was a Canadian animated children's television series produced by Nelvana and created by Robin Steele and Brianne Leary. The series originally aired from August 14, 1996 until April 13, 1998. Stickin' Around, originating as a series of one-minute interstitials on CBS in 1994, centered on two best friends named Stacy and Bradley; their hand-drawn adventures with their friends and family; and their fantasies, both encountering many problems they must face as they continue to grow up – with school, bullies, friends, and parents – and always coming up with imaginative ideas to eliminate these obstacles, such as becoming a superhero and putting themselves in a different environment where they have no trouble in defeating their enemies.

According to Nelvana, it uses "the advanced computer graphics of 'Boiler Paint', virtually convincing us that kids are creating their own animated series."

Stickin' Around won the Gemini Award for "Best Animated Program or Series" in the spring of 1998, while being nominated once again during the fall of 1998, for the Gemini of the same award.

Episodes

Characters 
Stacy Stickler: One of the main protagonists. An 8-year-old quiet but bossy girl who loves imagining many things with Bradley. She often says "For your big fat information" and "Real mature, Bradley". She sometimes serves as the voice of reason for Bradley's silliness and recklessness.
Bradley: The other main protagonist is Stacy's 9-year-old best friend. He wears thick black-framed glasses and a red backwards cap. He often imagines himself as a superhero, secret agent, robot, or vampire, namely as Rubber Guy, Cap Crusader, 00 Bradley, Robo Bradley, or Count Vladley. His favourite fantasy is that "Aliens from Uranus" are behind whatever problem they are facing, much to Stacy's annoyance. 
Frank: Stacy's overweight pet wiener dog who sometimes shares in their adventures and loves to eat. He often sees things as food because his over-hungry habits. He is very lazy and does not exercise much apart from chasing Stacy on the way to school.
Lester: Bradley's pet chameleon who blends into the background and causes a lot of trouble.
Lance:  A bully who loves to pick on everyone in school, especially Bradley, whom he nicknames "Scradley".
Russell: Lance's dimwitted best friend and sidekick and carries around with him a horrible odor. He always says "What?" when everyone says "Whoa Man! What's that funky smell?" and he repeats everything that Lance says. He actually says "Yeah…… [either what Lance said, or a synonym/variant]". He does surprisingly well in class.
Polly: Lance's friendly, intelligent younger half-sister who always gives words of knowledge and wisdom. She is often seen walking her lifeless pet poodle, Pepperoni, whom she refuses to believe is dead; she hates being called a baby, though.
Dill: Friend of Stacy and Bradley who has a very loud voice. Often, uses the words "HOLY MACKEREL!".
Stella Stickler: She's Stacy's caring but also a hot-headed mother. She loves fashion, she works hard, and hates being annoyed by Stacy and Bradley sometimes. She is very annoyed when Stanley is trying to "fix" things.
Stanley Stickler: Stacy's ambitious father. His inventions go wrong and he isn't good at cooking. A running gag is that he's always trying to fix appliances. As mentioned in the first episode entitled "Aaaand Action", he lives in "his own place" in the same apartments (Latchkey Garden Apartments).  He also seems to be kind of forgetful, because in the episode "Madame Know-it-All" it's a running gag that he thinks that his family has a lawn, but it's green gravel. He still doesn't seem to get that this "lawn" is never made out of grass because in the episode "We're Doomed" from the third season he still thinks that it is grass; and on the episode "It's My Party" from the second season, in which he didn't realize it was Stella's turn to throw a surprise birthday party for Stacy.
Ms. Mobley: Stacy and Bradley's cheerful but crazy teacher. She frequently says "Won't that be fun?" to one of them.
Principal Coffin: A scary school principal who looks like a zombie and a vampire. He speaks in a slow, spooky accent.
Mr. Lederhosen: Stacy and Bradley's tough P.E. teacher who acts like an army sergeant major.
Mr. Doddler: A senior citizen who wears a fez with a crescent moon on it. He was a farmer who often grows the ingredients to make the kids' favourite snack, Cheez Poopers, that are similar to Wotsits.  Stacy usually calls him "Mr. D."
William: A chubby boy who loves eating.
Melody: Stacy and Bradley's classmate who uses a wheelchair. She occasionally teams up with Stacy against Bradley and Dill.
Ashley: Stacy's rival and the wealthiest girl in school. She always wears a beret and is actually seen acting as somewhat of a snob and a spoiled brat.
Mrs. Salazar: A Spanish speaking woman who is Stacy and Bradley's kind-hearted neighbour.
Pickle: Pickle is Dill's pet parrot. His name is a pun on a dill pickle (a food).
Scooter: Scooter is William's pet hamster.
Freddy: Freddy is Melody's pet maggot.
Pepperoni: Pepperoni, as mentioned above, is Polly's lifeless pet dog.  Polly is usually seen dragging Pepperoni around by his leash.

Cast
Ashley Taylor (Tickell) as Stacy Stickler
Ashley Brown as Bradley
Marianna Galati as Polly
Andrew Craig as Lance
Amos Crawley as Russell
Daniel Goodfellow as Dill
Catherine Disher as Stella Stickler
Philip Williams as Stanley Stickler
Melleny Brown as Ms. Mobley
Benedict Campbell as Principal Coffin
Ron Rubin as Mr. Lederhosen
Nicholas Rice as Mr. Doddler
Daniel DeSanto as William
Leah Renee Cudmore as Melody
Lisa Yamanaka as Ashley
Allegra Fulton as Mrs. Salazar

Production
The series was executive produced by Michael Hirsh, Patrick Loubert, Gerard Mital and Clive A. Smith, supervising produced by Vince Commisso and Stephen Hodgins, and co-ordinating produced by Patricia R. Burns. Laura Kate Wallis, Marianne Culbert and Tom McGillis served as producers, with the series being directed by John Halfpenny, John Van Bruggen and Chad Hicks. Dale Schott and Hugh Duffy served as story editors and Michelle McCree and Alan Gregg served as YTV executive producers. Dan Hennessey served as a voice director and Karyn Bonello-Tester served as a casting administrator.

Broadcast and home media
In 1994, the show originated as a series of one-minute interstitials on CBS in the U.S. The series originally aired from 1996 to 1998 on YTV in Canada and on ABC in Australia, with reruns airing prominently on YTV until 2004 and again from 2006 until 2008. In Australia, it also aired on Cartoon Network from 2002 to 2004. In Latin America, it aired on Nickelodeon under the title Los Grafitos, which translates to "The Graphites." In the UK, it aired on Nickelodeon in 1996 and Channel 4 in 2004; and also on Disney Channel in Japan and on TVNZ 2 in New Zealand. It aired in the U.S. on Fox Kids from 1997 to 1998 and on Nickelodeon from October 21-22, 2000. It also aired with the Spanish-dubbed version on Telefutura, as part of Toonturama block, from July to November 2002. NBC's now-defunct Qubo aired reruns of the show from March 28, 2016 to July 24, 2020.

Stickin' Around is available to stream on FilmRise, as of 2022.

References

External links
 Stickin' Around's Profile at Big Cartoon Database
 

1990s Canadian animated television series
1996 Canadian television series debuts
1998 Canadian television series endings
Animated television series about children
Canadian children's animated comedy television series
Elementary school television series
English-language television shows
Fox Kids
Television series by Nelvana
YTV (Canadian TV channel) original programming